A petit four (plural: petits fours, also known as mignardises) is a small bite-sized confectionery or savory appetizer. The name is  French, petit four, meaning "small oven".

History and etymology 
In 18th and 19th century France, gas ovens did not exist. Large brick (Dutch design) ovens were used, which took a long time to heat up to bake bread, but also to cool down. Bakers used the ovens during the cooling process, taking advantage of their stored heat, for baking pastry. This was called baking à petit four (literally "at small oven"), a lower temperature which allowed pastry baking.

Types 
Petits fours come in three varieties:

 Glacé ("glazed"), iced or decorated tiny cakes covered in fondant or icing, such as small éclairs, and tartlets
 Salé ("salted"), savory bite-sized appetizers usually served at cocktail parties or buffets
 Sec ("dry"), dainty biscuits, baked meringues, macarons, and puff pastries

In a French patisserie, assorted small desserts are usually called mignardises, while hard, buttery biscuits are called petits fours.

See also 
 
 List of French desserts

References

Citations

General references 
 Garrett, Toba. Professional Cake Decorating. Hoboken, N.J.: John Wiley & Sons, 2007. p. 226.
 Kingslee, John. A Professional Text to Bakery and Confectionary. New Delhi, India: New Age International, 2006. p. 244.
 Maxfield, Jaynie. Cake Decorating for the First Time. New York: Sterling Pub, 2003. p. 58.
 Rinsky, Glenn, and Laura Halpin Rinsky. The Pastry Chef's Companion: A Comprehensive Resource Guide for the Baking and Pastry Professional. Hoboken, N.J.: John Wiley & Sons, 2009. p. 214.

French pastries
French cakes